Xanthosia rotundifolia is a species of the plant family Apiaceae, but sometimes also placed in Araliaceae or Mackinlayaceae. The informal name of this species, southern cross, is derived from the common name of the constellation Crux. The flowers, white in colour, symmetrical, and cruciform in outline, are reminiscent of the distinctive southern stars. It only occurs in southern regions of Southwest Australia, in a variety of soils over granite or laterite. It was first described by de Candolle in 1829.

References

Mackinlayoideae
Apiales of Australia
Eudicots of Western Australia